Gideon of Scotland Yard may refer to:

George Gideon of Scotland Yard, fictional policeman created by John Creasey under the pen name J. J. Marric
Gideon's Day, J. J. Marric's 1955 novel, reprinted as Gideon of Scotland Yard in 1958
Gideon's Day (film), originally released as Gideon of Scotland Yard, 1958 film starring Jack Hawkins as George Gideon
Gideon's Way, a 1964 British TV series starring John Gregson as George Gideon